The 2017 Uzbekistan First League was the 26th season of second level football in Uzbekistan since its independence in 1992. FK Yangiyer, Istiqlol Fergana, Neftchi Termez and Ghallakor-Barsa were promoted from the Second League. The draw was held on 1 February 2017 and first match was 1 April 2017.

Teams and locations

League table

Top goalscorers
 Shakhzod Ubaydullayev - Mashʼal-2 32 Goals  
 Abdul Aziz Yusupov- Sementchi 22 Goals  
 Orifkhoja Abdukholikov - NBU Osiyo 22 Goals  
 Dostonbek Toshmatov - Zaamin 17 Goals  
 Akmal Abdurahmanov - Surkhon Termez 15 Goals

References

External links 
PFL - First league results 
Uzbekistan First League 2016 - soccerway

2017
2